The  is a subcompact crossover SUV (B-segment) produced by the Japanese car manufacturer Nissan since 2010. Debuted as a production vehicle at the 2010 Geneva Motor Show in March and positioned below the C-segment Qashqai, it was introduced to North America at the 2010 New York International Auto Show to be sold for the 2011 model year.

The second-generation model was revealed for the European market in September 2019, offering larger dimensions by utilising the newer Renault–Nissan CMF-B platform. The second generation marks the withdrawal of the model from most markets outside Europe and Australasia to make way for the Nissan Kicks.

The name "juke" means to "dance or change directions demonstrating agility", and is also derived from the word "jukebox".



First generation (F15; 2010) 

On 11 February 2009, Nissan announced that the model would go into production at the Nissan Motor Manufacturing UK (NMUK) plant in Sunderland, United Kingdom, during 2010 following its appearance as the Nissan Qazana concept car at the 2009 Geneva Motor Show.

The Juke was designed at Nissan Design Europe in London and refined at Nissan's Design Centre in Japan. It is based on the Nissan B platform. The Sunderland plant (NMUK) manufactures for the European market, Australia and New Zealand, while Nissan's facility in Oppama, Japan, produces the vehicle for all other countries. Both Sunderland and Oppama are suppliers of the all-wheel drive variant. The Purwakarta plant (NMI) in Indonesia assembled the Juke for the domestic market and Thailand with a local content of 40 percent, front-wheel-drive only.

A rebadged version of the first-generation Juke was sold in China as the Infiniti ESQ.

Design 
The car's profile is dominated by the prominent wheel arches and the body's high waistline which contrast with the slim side windows, which is a modern interpretation of "coke bottle styling" popular during the 1960s and 1970s. Echoing a style first seen Nissan's high performance electric coupé concept shown at the 2007 Frankfurt Motor Show, the glasshouse resembles a racing helmet visor. A coupé-like appearance is achieved by the rear door handles being located near the C-pillars, within the window frame. Locating the rear door handles within the window frame is a Nissan styling tradition, begun with the 1985 Nissan Pathfinder. The sport motif continues inside with the red or grey-painted centre console bearing similarity to a motorcycle fuel tank.

The front end features a stacked array of lights. Running lamps and indicators are mounted atop the front wings, their lenses visible from inside the cabin as an aid to maneuvering. Below them, under the lower edges of an expansive, curved grille, the main headlamps are intended to be reminiscent of those fitted to rally cars during the 1960s and 1970s. Where fitted, fog lamps are situated on a third level within the sump guard at the bottom.

Cabin 
The Juke features seating for five (two in front, three in back). The rear seats have a 60/40 split and can be folded down independently in order to carry larger objects. The rear cargo area is small but features additional storage beneath the floor (front wheel drive models only).

The steering column instrumentation cluster features a tachometer, speedometer, and a small display between them that displays real-time fuel efficiency, odometer and trip odometer.

The center portion of the dash contains the radio and the I-CON control (if equipped). Depending on market and trim level the Juke may be equipped with iPod or USB connectivity, NissanConnect GPS navigation, rear-view camera and Bluetooth audio. A relatively deep glovebox on the passenger side houses an iPod connector (if equipped).

All but base models are equipped with Nissan's Integrated Control System, dubbed I-CON: a command module that sits in the lower dashboard, which manages both the climate control and the vehicle's drive mode (Normal, Sport or Eco). Its display and nomenclature change according to the function selected. Among the available display data are fuel efficiency stats, real-time G-force measurements and turbo boost pressure.

Markets

Japan 
In Japan, where the car was launched on 9 June 2010, orders totalled 10,943 units in its first month, surpassing Nissan's monthly target of 1,300. By 5 October 2010, Japanese sales had increased to 20,000 while European and US figures also exceeded expectations with orders for 30,000 and 17,500 cars taken for the respective markets. Four levels are specified. The RX and RS models are equipped with the HR15DE I4 engine, while the MR16DDT was supplied for the 16GT and 16GT FOUR.

United States 
Three trim levels were initially available with the 1.6-litre turbocharged MR16DDT petrol engine: S, SV and SL. The base engine is rated at 188 hp (140 kW) at 5,600 rpm and 177 lb⋅ft (240 N⋅m) of torque at 2,000 rpm. The base S model was available only with a CVT and lacks the I-CON display. The SV model adds I-CON, optional 6-speed manual transmission and moonroof. The SL model adds leather seats, USB connectivity and a rear-view camera. All-wheel drive with torque vectoring was optional on all trims but cannot be paired with a manual transmission.

After the 2017 model year, the Juke was discontinued in the United States.

Canada 
The S trim was available with either manual transmission or CVT. In the SV trim the I-CON system was not standard and was available as an option. In the SL trim the I-CON system was standard and a navigation system was available. The Juke was discontinued in Canada after the 2017 model year.

Europe 
Five trim levels are indicated for the 1.6-litre HR16DE petrol, 1.5-litre K9K diesel and 1.6-litre MR16DDT petrol engines: Visia, Acenta (also available with Sport and Premium packs), Tekna, Nismo and Nismo RS. In 2012, Nissan replaced the limited edition Juke Kuru with the Juke Shiro model. The Shiro was a limited edition Juke with white accents throughout the interior including white stitching on the leather seats, gear shifter and steering wheel as well as several other aesthetic options.

The car was launched in the UK on 24 September 2010.

New Zealand 
Two trim levels: ST and Ti, are available. Both are front-wheel drive and are powered by the HR16DE engine only available with a CVT. Some features on the higher-spec Ti include 17-inch alloy wheels, Dynamic Control System (DCS) drive modes, intelligent key with push start button and dual front, side and curtain airbags.

Indonesia 
Locally assembled by Nissan Motor Indonesia (NMI), the Juke for the Indonesian market comes with two trim levels: RX and Red, with one engine option, the 1.5-litre HR15DE inline-four. Both trims are only available with a CVT. The Red model, only available in Indonesia, adds roof spoiler, different grille colour and bigger audio display screen. On 12 February 2015, Nissan Motor Indonesia added "Revolt" trim to the lineup, while introducing facelift for Indonesian Juke. Between 2014 and 2017, the locally assembled Juke was exported to Thailand. Production ceased in September 2018.

Chile 
Sales began in 2012 for the Juke identical to the UK model sold in Chile. Three trim levels are offered: Sense, Advance and Exclusive, with two engines, 1.6 and 1.6 Turbo, with the turbo engine only available in the Exclusive trim level. All of them come with a CVT except the Exclusive Turbo, with the AWD option was only offered in the Exclusive.

Facelift 
At the 2014 Geneva Motor Show, Nissan unveiled the revised Nissan Juke for 2015 model year, which went on sale in the summer of 2014. On the exterior, the revision has new L-Shaped LED Daytime Running and Indicator clusters, new front and rear bumper styling and new colour options. New standard equipment includes a rear-view camera, keyless entry and Bluetooth hands-free phone system.

Juke Nismo 
New for 2013, the NISMO version differs from the base Juke in styling changes to the bumpers and side skirts, interior styling, modified suspension and steering,  wheels, an unspecified "torque vectoring" option, and engine tuning. There was also a higher-end Nismo RS variant available, with upgraded standard equipment (Recaro front seats, carbon fiber).

The New York Times review was generally positive, but: "About that styling: I love it, but you might hate it. The face is dominated by bug-eye headlamps, and the running lights bulge up above the hood such that they’re in the driver’s line of sight. At night, the effect is of large bio-luminescent slugs lounging atop the front fenders. Admittedly, it’s more appealing than I’m making it sound."

Juke-R 

The Juke-R is a limited production run Juke with the drivetrain, chassis, and the 3.8-litre VR engine from the Nissan GT-R that produces . Although Nissan planned to produce 17 or 23 units, only a total of five Juke-Rs were produced.

Infiniti ESQ 
Beginning in 2014, the Juke has been sold in China as the Infiniti ESQ. Debuted at 2014 Chengdu Auto Show, it is based on the pre-facelift Juke Nismo with its upgraded suspension, aero enhancements and 18-inch wheels.

As of 2016, the ESQ is the only Infiniti model not to have a name beginning with the letter Q.

Specifications

Marketing 
In August 2013, Nissan launched a commercial for the Juke, featuring Stormtroopers from the Star Wars series.

Second generation (F16; 2019) 

The second-generation Juke was unveiled on 3 September 2019 in London, Paris, Milan, Barcelona and Cologne. It went in production in October 2019. Nissan continued to build the Juke at its plant in Sunderland, UK. Customer deliveries begun in late November in European markets.

The vehicle is larger and based on an all-new CMF-B platform shared with the second-generation Renault Captur and the fifth-generation Renault Clio. The new platform makes extensive use of high-strength steel which is claimed to offer better stability, performance, and cornering capabilities. Despite that, the second-generation Juke is lighter by around  compared to the previous-generation model.

The new Juke adopts an all-new dashboard layout with a 'floating' central display, a new multifunction steering wheel, and a reduced number of buttons on the center console.

In March 2022, a 1.6-litre petrol hybrid engine option from the Renault Captur was introduced alongside the 2022 improved model.

For most markets outside Europe and Australasia, the second-generation Juke was never introduced as it was replaced by the V platform-based Kicks. The Kicks was revealed in North America in 2017 for 2018 model year, directly replacing the Juke. The Juke was also phased out in Japan and several Southeast Asian markets in favour of the Kicks e-Power.

The second-generation Juke was released in Australia in May 2020, with four trim levels available. It was also launched in Taiwan in November 2020, and sold alongside the locally assembled Kicks.

Safety 
The second-generation Juke was awarded a full five-star rating by Euro NCAP.

Reception 
It was reported that customers of the Juke mainly consisted of young buyers and the elderly, resulting in an average age in the late 40s.

In Europe, it is Nissan's second best-selling car behind the Qashqai. U.S. sales of the Juke slowed in 2015, but the crossover sold 38,000 units in 2013 and 2014, and about 36,000 in 2011 and 2012.

Awards and recognition 
The Nissan Juke received Insurance Institute for Highway Safety (IIHS) Top Safety Pick in 2011.
A Nissan Juke driven by stunt-driver Terry Grant claimed a Guinness World Record when it was driven around the Goodwood Hill Course on two wheels for 2 minutes and 55 seconds.
 The Nissan Juke received The Grand Tours 2017 "Nissan Juke Award" for the worst car of the year.

Sales

References

External links 

Juke
Mini sport utility vehicles
Crossover sport utility vehicles
Front-wheel-drive vehicles
All-wheel-drive vehicles
Euro NCAP small off-road
Cars introduced in 2010
Vehicles with CVT transmission

2020s cars
Cars of England